Eritreans in Sweden are citizens and residents of Sweden who are of Eritrean descent.

History 
The history of Eritreans in Sweden can be traced back to at least the 19th century. Tewolde-Medhin Gebre-Medhin, an Eritrean bible translator, studied theology in Stockholm from 1883 to 1887. 

In 2014, the first secretary at the Eritrean embassy in Sweden was asked to leave the country due to having organised espionage on Eritrean migrants in Sweden.

In 2016 Swedish Television reported that the Swedish Migration Agency had hired regime sympathisers as interpreters to interrogate migrants from Eritrea. The interpreters stated that if migrants spoke ill of the government of Eritrea their relatives still in country might suffer reprisals.

Demographics

According to Statistics Sweden, as of 2019, there are a total 45,734 Eritrea-born immigrants living in Sweden. Of those, 39,728 are citizens of Eritrea (22,705 men, 17,023 women). In 2016, there were also 19 registered remigrations from Sweden to Eritrea.

Education
In 2010, there were 1,460 students with Tigrinya as their mother tongue who participated in the state-run Swedish for Immigrants adult language program. Of these pupils, 399 had 0–6 years of education in their home country (Antal utbildningsår i hemlandet), 283 had 7–9 years of education in their home country, and 778 had 10 years education or more in their home country. As of 2012, 3,623 pupils with Tigrinya as their mother tongue and 3,618 Eritrea-born students were enrolled in the language program.

According to Statistics Sweden, as of 2016, 40% of Eritrea-born individuals aged 25 to 64 have attained Swedish primary education level (37% men, 45% women), 40% have attained a secondary education level (41% men, 39% women), 10% have attained a post-secondary education level of less than 3 years (12% men, 7% women), 7% have attained a post-secondary education of 3 years or more (8% men, 4% women), and 3% have attained an unknown education level (2% men, 4% women).

Employment
According to Statistics Sweden, as of 2014, Eritrea-born immigrants aged 25–64 in Sweden have an employment rate of approximately 43%. The share of employment among these foreign-born individuals varies according to education level, with employment rates of around 29% (29% males, 29% females) among Eritrea-born individuals who have attained a primary and lower secondary education level (5,668 individuals), 54% (54% males, 54% females) among those who have attained an upper secondary level (6,153 individuals), 47% (46% males, 48% females) among those who have attained a post-secondary education level of less than 3 years (1,338 individuals), and 62% (60% males, 66% females) among those who have attained a post-secondary education level of 3 years or more (1,012 individuals).

According to the Institute of Labor Economics, as of 2014, Eritrea-born residents in Sweden have an employment population ratio of about 57%. They also have an unemployment rate of approximately 7%.

Notable People
 [Alexander Isak]
He is an football player born and raised in Solna, Sweden by Eritrean parents

See also

Demographics of Eritrea
Education in Eritrea
Education in Sweden

References

Eritrean diaspora
Ethnic groups in Sweden